The first HMS Walrus (D24)  was a W-class destroyer of the British Royal Navy that saw service in the final months of World War I.

Construction and commissioning
Walrus was ordered in December 1916 and was laid down by the Fairfield Shipbuilding and Engineering Company at Govan, Scotland, in February 1917. She was launched on 27 December 1917 and commissioned on 8 March 1918. She was assigned the pennant number G17 in April 1918, but it was changed to D24 during the interwar period.

Service history
All of the V- and W-class destroyers, Walrus among them, were assigned to the Grand Fleet or Harwich Force for the rest of World War I, which ended with the armistice with Germany on 11 November 1918.

On 6 June 1924, Walrus was recommissioned at Devonport for service in the Mediterranean Fleet along with the rest of the 5th Destroyer Flotilla, which in 1925 was redesignated the 1st Destroyer Flotilla. She entered dockyard hands at Sheerness in England on 15 November 1926 for a refit, and recommissioned on 5 April 1927 to resume duty with the 1st Destroyer Flotilla in the Mediterranean. She re-commissioned at Devonport on 11 June 1929 for continued service with the 1st Destroyer Flotilla in the Mediterranean.

Walrus was recommissioned in reserve on 30 November 1932 and transferred to the Reserve Fleet, and placed in reserve at Devonport. In 1934 she was moved to Rosyth, Scotland, where she remained in reserve.

Loss
The Royal Navy decided to convert Walrus into an antiaircraft escort, and in February 1938 a tug took her under tow from Rosyth with a skeleton crew of four men aboard bound for Chatham Dockyard, where she was to undergo the conversion. During the voyage, however, a powerful storm struck the North Sea, and on 12 February 1938 her towline broke in high winds and heavy seas and she was driven ashore on Mascus rocks in Scarboroughs North Bay. The four men aboard Walrus made it to shore safely in one of her boats.

Final disposition
Deemed beyond economical repair, Walrus was sold to Round Brothers of Sunderland, England, on 5 March 1938 for scrapping. She was refloated on 29 March 1938 and scrapped in October 1938.

References

Bibliography

External links
 Photo of HMS Walrus prior to 1924
 Photo of HMS Walrus wrecked in February 1938

 

V and W-class destroyers of the Royal Navy
Ships built on the River Clyde
1917 ships
World War I destroyers of the United Kingdom
Maritime incidents in 1938
Shipwrecks of England